The Niuafo'ou Plate is a small tectonic plate located west of the islands of Tonga. This plate is sandwiched between the Pacific Plate to the north, the very unstable Tonga Plate to the east and the Australian Plate to the west. It is primarily surrounded by divergent boundaries. This plate is riddled with active faults thus making the area extremely earthquake prone.

See also

References

Tectonic plates
Geology of the Pacific Ocean